Choeromorpha vivesi is a species of beetle in the family Cerambycidae. It was described by Stephan von Breuning in 1978. It is found in Asia, in countries such as Indonesia.

References

Choeromorpha
Beetles described in 1978